The 2018 SprintX GT Championship Series is the second season of the SprintX GT Championship Series. Michael Cooper and Jordan Taylor are the defending champions in the highest class, the Pro class in GT. It is the second season sanctioned by the United States Auto Club. The season began on 23 March at Circuit of the Americas and will end on 12 August at Utah Motorsports Campus. GTS cars are separated from GT and GT Cup, as the GT4-based category has its own races this season.

Calendar
On 17 November 2017, WC Vision announced the 2018 calendar. All rounds are headliner events held in the United States. Circuit of the Americas was the season opener instead of Virginia. Mosport was dropped from the schedule in favor of Portland.

Entry list

GT/GT Cup

GTS

Race results

Championship standings

Drivers' championships
Championship points were awarded for the first twenty positions in each race. The overall pole-sitter also received one point. Entries were required to complete 50% of the winning car's race distance in order to be classified and earn points.

GT/GT Cup Overall

GT Pro-Am

GT Am

GTS Overall

GTS Am

Notes

References

External links

GT World Challenge America
SprintX GT Championship Series